Fie is a village in Risør municipality in Agder county, Norway. The village is located near the Skaggerak coastline in southeastern Norway.

References

Villages in Agder
Risør